Lessons on the Analytic of the Sublime is a 1991 book about the philosopher Immanuel Kant's Critique of Judgment (1790), focusing on Kant's description of the sublime, by the French philosopher Jean-François Lyotard. The book received positive reviews following the appearance of its English translation in 1994.

Summary

Lyotard discusses the philosopher Immanuel Kant's Critique of Judgment, focusing on Kant's description of the sublime.

Publication history
Lessons on the Analytic of the Sublime was first published in 1991 by Éditions Galilée. In 1994, Stanford University Press published an English translation by Elizabeth Rottenberg as part of the series Meridian: Crossing Aesthetics.

Reception
The book received positive reviews from Thomas Huhn in Journal of Aesthetics and Art Criticism and A. T. Nuyen in Philosophy of the Social Sciences. Huhn described the book as "brilliant", writing that Lyotard provided a "provocative reading of Kant's doctrine of the sublime". Nuyen credited Lyotard with providing a "close and careful" discussion of portions of the Critique of Judgment.

Peter Fenves praised Lyotard for posing the "question of the subject of aesthetic judgment" with "renewed vigor". The philosopher Alan D. Schrift suggested that Lessons on the Analytic of the Sublime is Lyotard's most important work since The Differend (1983).

References

Bibliography
Books

 
 

Journals

 
  
 

1991 non-fiction books
Aesthetics books
Books about Immanuel Kant
Books by Jean-François Lyotard
French non-fiction books